Braverman is a surname. Notable people with the surname include:

Adam L. Braverman (born 1975), American lawyer
Alan N. Braverman (born 1947/8), American media executive
Alan Braverman (born 1973), American businessman
Alexander Braverman (born 1974), Israeli mathematician
Amy Braverman, American statistician
Arthur Braverman (born 1942), American Japanese translator
Avishay Braverman (born 1948), Israeli economist and politician and president of the Ben-Gurion University of the Negev
Bart Braverman (born 1946), American actor
Blair Braverman (born 1988), American adventurer, dogsled racer, musher, advice columnist and nonfiction writer
Charles Braverman (born 1944), American filmmaker
Daniel Braverman (born 1993), American NFL football player
Elena Braverman, Russian, Israeli, and Canadian mathematician
Eric R. Braverman (born 1957), American physician
Harry Braverman (1920–1976), American Marxist economist
Kate Braverman (born 1950), American novelist
Lewis E. Braverman (1929–2019), American endocrinologist
Mark Braverman (born 1948), American psychologist and activist for Palestinian rights
Mark Braverman (mathematician) (born 1984), Israeli mathematician
Maurice Braverman (1916–2002), American civil rights lawyer
Miriam Braverman (1920–2002), American librarian
Sara Braverman (1918–2013), Israeli military operative
Suella Braverman (born 1980), British politician, current Home Secretary
Sylvia Braverman (1918–2013), American artist

See also 
Bye Bye Braverman, 1968 film
List of Parenthood characters, fictional family named Braverman

Jewish surnames